Igor Shevchenko (born 1985) is a Russian footballer.

Igor or Ihor Shevchenko may also refer to:
 Igor Shevchenko (lawyer), Russian from Ukraine and prosecutor of Sevastopol
 Ihor Shevchenko (born 1971), Ukrainian politician
 Ihor Ševčenko (1922–2009), Polish-born philologist and historian of Ukrainian origin

See also
 Shevchenko